James Scott (born March 28, 1952) is a retired American football wide receiver who played seven seasons for the Chicago Bears in the National Football League (NFL). He was originally selected by the New York Jets in the 1975 NFL Draft.

In 1974, he played for the Chicago Fire of the World Football League (WFL), catching 52 passes for 755 yards and 8 touchdowns. He had his best pro season in 1981, for the Montreal Alouettes of the Canadian Football League (CFL), when he caught 81 passes for 1422 yards and 6 touchdowns and was a conference All-Star.

Scott is now living back in his home state of Texas, near Dallas.

1952 births
Living people
People from Longview, Texas
Players of American football from Texas
American football wide receivers
Chicago Fire (WFL) players
Chicago Bears players
American players of Canadian football
Canadian football wide receivers
Montreal Alouettes players
Trinity Valley Cardinals football players
People from Gladewater, Texas